Peter Gill (born 9 June 1951) is an English former heavy metal drummer, formerly a member of The Glitter Band, Saxon and Motörhead.

Gill was one of the two drummers in The Glitter Band, then formed part of the original line-up of Saxon in 1978. He stayed with them until 1981, recording their first four albums, leaving the band after he injured his hand. Gill later spent three years with Motörhead, 1984 to 1987, recording four new tracks for the compilation No Remorse, The Birthday Party and one full album, Orgasmatron. The band also toured extensively in the time Gill was a member. After years of absence Gill reunited with his former Saxon colleagues in a new band, named Son of a Bitch with bassist Steve Dawson and guitarist Graham Oliver. Gill stayed briefly in the band, recording only one album called Victim You in 1996.

Pete Gill detoxed in 2004 after having a problem with alcohol for two years, and is unable to play anymore due to severe arthritis which "has spread to my hands and my legs and my back".

Discography

Saxon
 (1979) Saxon
 (1980) Wheels of Steel
 (1980) Strong Arm of the Law
 (1981) Denim and Leather

Motörhead
 (1984) No Remorse
 (1985) The Birthday Party
 (1986) Orgasmatron

Son of a Bitch
 (1996) Victim You

Video and DVDs
 (1986) The Birthday Party VHS Video – 60 Minutes.

References

English heavy metal drummers
English rock drummers
Saxon (band) members
Motörhead members
Living people
1951 births
Musicians from Sheffield
Place of birth missing (living people)